The Louisiana Tech Bulldogs football team represent Louisiana Tech University in college football at the NCAA Division I Football Bowl Subdivision (formerly Division I-A) level. After 12 seasons in the Western Athletic Conference, Louisiana Tech began competing as a member of Conference USA in 2013. Since 1968, the Bulldogs have played their home games at Joe Aillet Stadium. Since its first season in 1901, Louisiana Tech has compiled an all-time record of 641 wins, 487 losses, and 38 ties. In 122 football seasons, the Bulldogs have won 3 Division II national championships, won 25 conference championships, and played in 28 postseason games, including 13 major college bowl games. The Bulldogs are currently coached by Sonny Cumbie.

History

Early history (1901–1939)
Louisiana Tech University first fielded a football team in 1901. The team's head coach was Edwin Barber. Percy Prince became the head football coach in 1909 and coached the Bulldog football team through the 1915 season in which Louisiana Tech won the Louisiana Intercollegiate Athletic Association championship. George Bohler served as the head football coach at Louisiana Tech from 1930 to 1933, compiling a 15–17 record. Bohler's 1931 team finished an undefeated 7–0, but other than that, Bohler's Bulldogs were unable to win more than four games in a single season. Eddie McLane left Samford and replaced Bohler in 1934. He led the team through the 1938 season, compiling a 27–19 record, which included three consecutive winning seasons from 1935 to 1937. In 1939, Ray E. Davis became the head coach of the Bulldogs for a single season, going 5-6.

Joe Aillet Era (1940–1966)
Northwestern State quarterbacks coach Joe Aillet took over the Bulldogs football program in 1940, leading the team through the 1966 season. Aillet led the Bulldogs to 21 winning seasons in his 27 as head coach (Tech didn't field a football team in 1943 due to World War II). Ailett led the Bulldogs to three 9–1 seasons in 1955, 1959 and 1964. Aillet's namesake is Louisiana Tech's home stadium, Joe Aillet Stadium. Aillet retired as Tech's head football coach following the 1966 season, and is the winningest head coach in Tech football history at 151–86–8.

Maxie Lambright Era (1967–1978)

Southern Miss assistant coach Maxie Lambright took over the Bulldogs football program after Aillet's retirement. Under Lambright, the Bulldogs were able to enjoy even greater success, winning three consecutive national championships from 1972 to 1974, along with seven conference championships. Lambright also coached quarterback Terry Bradshaw. Initially, Bradshaw was second on the depth chart at quarterback behind Phil Robertson, who would later become famous as the inventor of the Duck Commander duck call and television personality on the A&E program Duck Dynasty. Bradshaw caused a media frenzy on account of his reputation of being a football sensation from nearby Shreveport. Robertson was a year ahead of Bradshaw and was the starter for two seasons in 1966 and 1967, and chose not to play in 1968. As Robertson put it: "I'm going for the ducks, you [Terry] can go for the bucks." In 1969, Bradshaw was considered by most professional scouts to be the most outstanding college football player in the nation. As a junior, he amassed 2,890 total yards, ranking No. 1 in the NCAA, and led his team to a 9–2 record and a 33–13 win over Akron in the Rice Bowl. In his senior season, he gained 2,314 yards, ranking third in the NCAA, and led his team to an 8–2 record. His decrease in production was mainly because his team played only 10 games that year, and he was taken out of several games in the second half because his team had built up a huge lead. Bradshaw graduated owning virtually all Louisiana Tech passing records at the time and would go on to enjoy a Hall of Fame professional football career quarterbacking the NFL's Pittsburgh Steelers. In 1984, Bradshaw was inducted into the inaugural class of the Louisiana Tech sports hall of fame. Four years later, he was inducted into the state of Louisiana's sports hall of fame. Lambright retired as Louisiana Tech's head football coach following the 1978 season, leaving with a 95–36–2 record.

Larry Beightol Era (1979)
Arkansas offensive line coach Larry Beightol succeeded Lambright. Tech suffered one of its worst seasons in school history under Beightol, finishing with a 3–8 record in 1979. Beightol was fired after a 1–9 start to the 1979 season, and endured mass defections from players who had previously competed in the last two Independence Bowls. Pat Patterson served as interim head coach for the final game of the season, winning 13-10 over local rival Northeast Louisiana.

Billy Brewer era (1980–1982)
Southeastern Louisiana head coach Billy Brewer replaced Beightol and was head coach at Louisiana Tech from 1980 through 1982, posting a record of 19 wins, 15 losses, and 1 tie. His last season at Tech (1982) saw his Bulldogs win the Southland Conference title with a 10–3 record. They lost to Delaware 17–0 in the first round of the Division I-AA (now Football Championship Subdivision) playoffs. Brewer's success with the Bulldogs led to interest from many I-A (now FBS) schools for their head football coaching positions. Brewer accepted an offer from Ole Miss after the 1982 season.

A. L. Williams era (1983–1986)
Coach A. L. Williams came to Louisiana Tech from Northwestern State and compiled a 28–19–1 record in four seasons. In 1983, the team had a losing record, 4–7. Tech's best season during this era came in 1984, when the team finished with a 7–4 regular season record, capturing the Southland Conference championship via their 5–1 conference record. The Bulldogs then advanced to the 1984 NCAA Division I-AA Football Championship Game, falling to Montana State, 19–6, and finishing with an overall record of 10–5 for the season. The following season, the team had an 8–3 regular season record, but did not make the playoffs. After a 6–4–1 record in 1986, Williams stepped down as Louisiana Tech's head football coach.

Carl Torbush era (1987)
Ole Miss defensive coordinator Carl Torbush was hired as Williams' replacement in 1987. Torbush only coached the Bulldogs for one season, leading the team to a 3–8 record. Torbush elected to leave Tech for the defensive coordinator position at North Carolina under head coach Mack Brown after the 1987 season.

Joe Raymond Peace era (1988–1995)

Louisiana Tech promoted assistant coach Joe Raymond Peace to head coach following Torbush's departure. Under Peace, the Bulldogs compiled a 40–44–4 record that included back-to-back eight-win campaigns in 1990 and 1991. The Bulldogs moved to the now non-football Big West Conference in 1993. Peace was fired following back to back 3–8 campaigns in 1993 and 1994 and a 5–6 season in 1995.

Gary Crowton era (1996–1998)
Tech promoted offensive coordinator Gary Crowton to head coach after Peace's firing. Under Crowton, the Bulldogs went 21–13. The Bulldogs' best season during this era came in 1997 when the Bulldogs finished 9–2. Crowton left Louisiana Tech following the 1998 season to accept the position of offensive coordinator with the NFL's Chicago Bears.

Jack Bicknell era (1999–2006)
Coach Jack Bicknell left New Hampshire in 1997 to serve as the offensive line coach for Louisiana Tech. When head coach Gary Crowton left to become the Chicago Bears' offensive coordinator in 1999, Bicknell was promoted to replace him. In his first season as head coach, he led the Bulldogs to an 8–3 record, the school's first AP Top 25 ranking, and a 29–28 upset win over eventual SEC champion Alabama, which is the only win by a team from a non-AQ or Group of Five conference over an SEC champion since the dawn of the BCS era in 1998. In 2001, Louisiana Tech won the Western Athletic Conference championship during its first year of membership, earning Bicknell conference Coach of the Year honors. Louisiana Tech played Clemson in the Crucial.com Humanitarian Bowl, the program's first postseason appearance since 1990. Tech's star player that year was quarterback Luke McCown. During his tenure at Louisiana Tech, Bicknell's teams defeated national powers Alabama, Michigan State and Oklahoma State. 22 of his players were either drafted by or signed free agent contracts with National Football League teams. Bicknell was fired by Louisiana Tech following a 3–10 campaign in 2006.

Derek Dooley era (2007–2009)

Miami Dolphins tight ends coach Derek Dooley, son of coaching legend Vince Dooley, was hired as Bicknell's replacement in 2007. Tech enjoyed a mediocre run during Dooley's tenure starting out at 5–7 in 2007. In 2008, the Bulldogs improved to 8–5 with a win in the Independence Bowl to cap the year. In 2009, the Bulldogs slipped to 4–8. Dooley, who was also serving as Tech's athletics director, left Louisiana Tech after the 2009 season to accept the head coaching position at Tennessee.

Sonny Dykes era (2010–2012)

On January 20, 2010, Arizona offensive coordinator Sonny Dykes was hired to replace Dooley as the head football coach at Louisiana Tech. Dykes brought with him an exciting, up-tempo, pass-oriented offense known as the Air Raid.

In Dykes' first season, LA Tech's record improved to 5–7 overall and 4–4 in the WAC. Despite coaching his team to a losing record, LA Tech's offense improved in several areas of the NCAA statistical ranks including passing offense (91st in 2009 to 62nd in 2010) and total offense (66th to 52nd) while the team's average offensive national rank improved from 65th in 2009 to 54th in 2010. Despite a 1–4 start in 2011, Louisiana Tech rallied to win seven consecutive games to cap off the regular season with the program's first WAC football title since 2001 and an appearance in the Poinsettia Bowl to cap the 8–5 season. As a result of LA Tech's success, Dykes was honored as the 2011 WAC Coach of the Year. At the end of the 2011 season, Dykes signed a contract extension to increase his base salary to at least $700,000. Dykes resigned as Louisiana Tech head football coach following the 2012 season to accept the same position at California. In 2012, Louisiana Tech joined Conference USA. That season, they finished with a 9–3 record, the program's best since 1997, but did not participate in a bowl game. Dykes guided the Bulldogs to a 22–15 record over his 3 seasons as head coach.

Skip Holtz era (2013–2021)

On December 13, 2012, former UConn, East Carolina, and South Florida head coach Skip Holtz, son of legendary coach Lou Holtz, accepted an offer to become the head coach for the Louisiana Tech Bulldogs. Holtz's first season, the 2013 campaign, was a rebuilding year as the Bulldogs finished 4–8. However, 2014 would see a big improvement. Holtz's Bulldogs went on to finish first in C-USA West at 9–5 with a 35–18 win over Illinois in the Heart of Dallas Bowl. In 2015, the Bulldogs continued their success, finishing 9–4 and winning the New Orleans Bowl over Arkansas State, 47–28. In 2016, Holtz's Bulldogs finished 9–5. They won the C-USA West Division title and lost in the conference championship game against East Division champion Western Kentucky. Tech then accomplished their third consecutive bowl victory by defeating Navy in the Armed Forces Bowl by kicking a late field goal to win 48–45.
In 2017 Louisiana Tech handily defeated SMU in the Frisco Bowl 51–10 in Frisco, Texas. Tech's fifth consecutive bowl win was in 2018 when the Bulldogs defeated Hawaii in the Hawaii Bowl 31–14. In 2019, the Bulldogs finished 10–3 and continued the FBS's longest bowl winning streak at 6 with another victory over a P5 team in the Independence Bowl, defeating Miami, 14–0. It was the first G5 shutout of a P5 team ever in a bowl game and it was the first shutout in the Independence Bowl's 40+ year history. The Bulldogs went 5–5 in 2020, finishing with a 38–3 loss to Georgia Southern in the New Orleans Bowl. Holtz was fired after the 2021 season when the Bulldogs finished 3–9.

Sonny Cumbie era (2022–present)
On November 30, 2021, Sonny Cumbie was named the 34th head coach of the Bulldogs. Cumbie previously served as the interim head coach, offensive coordinator, and quarterbacks coach at Texas Tech University. Cumbie signed a five-year contract with Louisiana Tech worth $4.85 million.

Conference affiliations
 Independent (1901–1914)
 Louisiana Intercollegiate Athletic Association (1915–1925)
 Southern Intercollegiate Athletic Association (1925–1941)
 Louisiana Intercollegiate Conference (1939–1947)
 Gulf States Conference (1948–1970)
 Southland Conference (1971–1986)
 NCAA Division I-AA independent (1987–1988)
 NCAA Division I-A independent (1989–1992)
 Big West Conference (1993–1995)
 NCAA Division I-A independent (1996–2000)
 Western Athletic Conference (2001–2012)
 Conference USA (2013–present)

Championships

National championships

Louisiana Tech claims three football national titles. From 1964 to 1972, four regional bowl games were played that led up to a wire service poll to determine the final champion of Division II's predecessor, the NCAA College Division. In 1972, Louisiana Tech beat Tennessee Tech 35–0 in the Grantland Rice Bowl to win the Mideast Regional Championship. The Bulldogs finished the 1972 season undefeated at 12–0 and were subsequently named 1972 College Division National Champions by the National Football Foundation. Despite not playing in a regional championship, Delaware was named 1972 NCAA College Division National Champions by the Associated Press and United Press International. A playoff series was started in 1973 to determine the Division II champion. In the inaugural Division II football playoffs, Louisiana Tech beat Western Illinois in the quarterfinals and Boise State in the Pioneer Bowl semifinals. Tech advanced to the championship game to beat Western Kentucky 34–0 and finished the season with a 12–1 record as 1973 NCAA Division II National Champions. In 1974, the UPI did not recognize the winner of the playoffs, Central Michigan, as national champions. Instead, the UPI presented the 1974 Division II national title to Louisiana Tech, who finished with an 11–1 record.

Regional championships
Louisiana Tech won three regional football championships. From 1964 to 1972, four regional bowl games were played that led up to a wire service poll to determine the final champion of Division II's predecessor, the NCAA College Division. In 1968, Louisiana Tech beat Akron 33–13 in the Grantland Rice Bowl to become Mideast Regional Champions. In 1971, Louisiana Tech defeated Eastern Michigan 14–3 in the Pioneer Bowl to become Midwest Regional Champions. In 1972, Louisiana Tech beat Tennessee Tech 35–0 in the Grantland Rice Bowl to win the Mideast Regional Championship.

Conference championships
Louisiana Tech has won 25 conference championships, twenty outright and five shared. The Bulldogs have won 2 Louisiana Intercollegiate Athletic Association championships, 3 Louisiana Intercollegiate championships, 10 Gulf States championships, 8 Southland championships, and 2 WAC championships. It is of note that Tech finished with a 9–2 record in 1997, the best record of the 9 Division I-A Independents. In 1999 Tech finished with an 8–3 record, the only one of the 7 Division I-A Independents with a winning record.

† Co-champions

Division championships
In 2013, Louisiana Tech first joined a conference with football divisions, Conference USA, and since then the Bulldogs have won C-USA West twice.

Postseason history
Louisiana Tech has produced an all-time postseason record of 19 wins, 8 losses, and 1 tie in 28 total appearances.

Division II postseason history
During its time in Division II, Louisiana Tech played in 9 Division II postseason games, with the Bulldogs accumulating a record of 7–2.

Division I-AA playoff history
During its time in Division I-AA (now referred to as Football Championship Subdivision), Louisiana Tech played in six Division I-AA playoff games. The Bulldogs accumulated a 4–2 record in these games.

Division I FBS bowl history

Louisiana Tech has played in 13 Division I FBS bowl games, with the Bulldogs garnering a 8-4-1 record.

Rivalries

Louisiana

Louisiana Tech and Louisiana first played in 1910, and continued to play off and on until the series became a near-yearly contest from 1924-2000. The two have been conference foes for much of their history, sharing time in the Southern Intercollegiate Athletic Association, Louisiana Intercollegiate Conference, Gulf States Conference, and Southland Conference. In 2000, following Tech's move to the WAC and Louisiana's move to the Sun Belt, the yearly contest ended, with other games happening in 2003, 2004, 2014, and 2015. A home-and-home series is currently scheduled in 2026 and 2029. Louisiana Tech currently leads the series 48-33-6 through the 2015 season.

Louisiana-Monroe

Louisiana Tech and Louisiana-Monroe first played in 1953 and played each season until 1991, with 4 additional meetings until 2000. The rivalry began as a conference game, when Louisiana-Monroe, then known as Northeast Louisiana State College, moved to the Gulf States Conference. When the conference dissolved at the end of the 1970 season, the two teams continued to meet yearly out of conference. The game briefly again became a conference matchup in 1982 following Northeast Louisiana's move to the Southland Conference, before becoming out of conference once again when Louisiana Tech left the conference following the 1986 season. Despite the two schools being locating just 35 miles apart, the Bulldogs and Warhawks have not played each other since 2000, with Tech winning 42-19 in Monroe. A potential bowl matchup in 2012 between the two almost happened in the Independence Bowl, though Louisiana Tech turned down the offer in an attempt to receive a more prestigious bid. Another potential matchup almost happened in 2020, but was cancelled due to COVID-19 concerns within the Warhawk program. While the two programs continue to play in other sports, no future football games are currently scheduled. Louisiana Tech currently leads the series 29-13 through the 2000 season.

Southern Miss

Louisiana Tech and Southern Miss first played in 1935 and played each season from 1946 until 1972. Tech and USM were conference foes in the Southern Intercollegiate Athletic Association from 1935 to 1941, as well as the Gulf States Conference from 1948 until Southern Miss left in 1952. The Bulldogs and Golden Eagles played 11 times between 1975 and 1992. In 2008, Louisiana Tech Athletic Director and Head Coach Derek Dooley and Southern Miss Athletic Director Richard Giannini signed a four-game contract to renew the rivalry with the first game being played in Ruston on September 25, 2010. With Tech joining Conference USA in 2013, the Bulldogs and Eagles have continued the series as conference rivals. Southern Miss won the 2021 meeting 35-19 in the 53rd meeting between these two at Joe Aillet Stadium in Ruston, Louisiana on November 19, 2021. With Southern Miss leaving Conference USA for the Sun Belt in 2022, the future of the rivalry is uncertain, although future matchups have been scheduled for 2025 and 2026. Southern Miss leads the series 36–17 through the 2021 season.

Home stadiums

Joe Aillet Stadium (1968–present)

Louisiana Tech plays home games at Joe Aillet Stadium, which has garnered the nickname The Joe. The stadium is located on the campus of Louisiana Tech University in Ruston, Louisiana. Led by quarterback Terry Bradshaw, the Bulldogs christened Louisiana Tech Stadium with a 35–7 victory over East Carolina on September 28, 1968. The stadium was given its current namesake in 1972 to honor Hall of Fame coach Joe Aillet. The stadium opened with a capacity of 23,000, and additional seating was added to increase capacity to 30,600 in 1989. The stadium was upgraded in 1985 with the addition of the luxury sky box. In 1997 the stadium's attendance record of 28,714 was set against Northeast Louisiana. A new lighting system was installed in 2006. After playing the first 38 seasons in Aillet Stadium on natural grass, FieldTurf was installed in 2006. The FieldTurf was subsequently replaced in 2008 and again in 2015. In 2009 Louisiana Tech installed the largest high definition video board in the WAC covering 1,485 digital square feet behind the north end zone of the stadium at a cost of $2 million. In 2014 capacity was reduced to 27,717 while the area behind the south end zone of Joe Aillet Stadium was under construction. The $22 million 70,000 square foot Davison Athletics Complex was completed the following year increasing capacity to 28,019 for the 2015 season. In 2017 the stadium added 202 Eaton Ephesus LED fixtures provided and installed by Geo-Surfaces, a sports lighting company based in Baton Rouge, LA. In 2021, a multi-phase project was announced to upgrade and expand the stadium, including the addition of 2 new Daktronics video boards in the corners of the north end zone, a Champions Plaza adjacent to Stadium Drive on the north side of the stadium, and a ribbon board added to the facade of the Davison Athletics Complex on the south end. Most notably, the plans also include the construction of a new 22,300-square foot student-athlete access center to be located at the north end of the stadium. These plans are all expected to be finished within the next 5 to 10 years.

Independence Stadium (alternate, 1928–present)

Louisiana Tech occasionally hosts games at Independence Stadium in Shreveport, Louisiana. The Bulldogs have played 71 games in Independence Stadium including 4 trips to the Independence Bowl and have produced an all-time record of 45–23–3 at Independence Stadium. Tech has hosted many teams in Independence Stadium during the regular season including Southern Miss, North Texas, Tulsa, Houston, Baylor, California, Texas A&M, SMU, Oklahoma State, Miami, UTEP, and Grambling State. Louisiana Tech's regular season home attendance record of 43,279 was set in 2003 against the Miami Hurricanes in a nationally televised game on ESPN. The 1990 Independence Bowl featuring Tech and Maryland drew 48,325 fans, the record attendance for a Louisiana Tech game in Independence Stadium. The stadium's capacity is 50,459. During the 2012 season, No. 23 Louisiana Tech hosted No. 22 Texas A&M in Independence Stadium on ESPNU in an epic battle in which the Aggies led by Johnny Manziel prevailed, 59–57. This game was ranked by ESPN as the No. 8 game of the 2012 season.

Traditions

Band of Pride

The Band of Pride is the official marching band of Louisiana Tech University. Since its inception in 1906, the band has grown to approximately 200 members. The Band of Pride performs at all home football games, select road games, pep rallies, and various university events throughout the year.

Spirit of '88

Inside the Davison Athletics Complex behind the south end of Joe Aillet Stadium stands a bronze Bulldog statue named the Spirit of '88. At the beginning of each game, every  player touches the statue before running onto the field, which is said to bring good luck to the Bulldogs. The statue commemorates the 1988 Bulldog football team, the last season in which Tech competed at the Division I-AA level. The 1988 team had to endure one of the most difficult schedules in school history while playing with only 65 scholarships, as opposed to the 95 allowed by Division I-A teams at the time. In what was the nation's 11th toughest schedule that year, the Bulldogs faced five I-A bowl teams including Houston, Florida State and Texas A&M. Those experiences likely played a key role in Tech finishing 4–6 the following year, its first in Division I-A, and then 8–3–1 in 1990 with an Independence Bowl berth. The Bulldogs eventually reeled off 18 consecutive home victories, tying the all-time stadium record set by head coach Maxie Lambright's great teams of the early 1970s.

Fire Bell

In 1879, the Fire Bell was cast by L.M. Rumsey & Co. in St. Louis, Missouri. Founded in 1897, the Ruston Fire Department was called to fires by ringing the Fire Bell that hung in a wooden tower behind Perkins Drug Store located at 116 N. Trenton Street. The Fire Bell was used for many years in Ruston to alert the town of burning fires. After Joe Aillet Stadium was built in 1968, the old Fire Bell was transported to the stadium and placed behind the end zone. To commemorate the bravery of the bulldog that perished saving the lives of the two students in the burning house in 1899, the Fire Bell is rung before every home football game to call the Bulldogs to battle.

Tech

Tech is the name of the fawn and white lineage of English bulldogs which have served as Louisiana Tech's live mascot since 1930. In 1930, a rescued bullpup named Tech I was donated to serve as Louisiana Tech's first live mascot by the family of two football players, Henry and Thomas Matthews. Tech is owned by the Louisiana Tech Student Government Association and resides with either a faculty member or local alumnus selected by the SGA. The current live mascot is Tech XXII, who began his career in the Spring of 2018.

Hall of Fame
The following former players have been inducted in the respective Hall of Fames.

College Football Hall of Fame

Terry Bradshaw (QB), inducted in 1996
Fred Dean (DL), inducted in 2009
Willie Roaf (T), inducted in 2014

Pro Football Hall of Fame

Terry Bradshaw (QB), inducted in 1989
Fred Dean (DE), inducted in 2008
Willie Roaf (T), inducted in 2012

Canadian Football Hall of Fame

Tom Hinton (G), inducted in 1991
Matt Dunigan (QB), inducted in 2006

Arena Football Hall of Fame

Eddie Brown (offensive specialist), inducted in 2011

Individual award winners

Fred Biletnikoff Award

Troy Edwards (WR), 1998

Ray Guy Award

Ryan Allen (P), 2011
Ryan Allen (P), 2012

Sammy Baugh Trophy

Colby Cameron (QB), 2012

Paul Warfield Trophy

Troy Edwards (WR), 1998

Consensus All-Americans

Willie Roaf (OL), 1992
Troy Edwards (WR), 1998
Ryan Allen (P), 2012

Heisman Trophy voting history

NFL Draft

76 Louisiana Tech players have been drafted into the National Football League (NFL) since the league began holding drafts in 1936. Five Bulldogs have been selected in the first round including Terry Bradshaw, Roger Carr, Willie Roaf, Troy Edwards, and Vernon Butler; with Bradshaw being the overall number one pick in 1970. Tech had one player selected in the 2021 NFL Draft, DT Milton Williams.

Current NFL players
The following are former Louisiana Tech players in the NFL, as of September 10, 2022:
Justin Ellis (DT), New York Giants
Amik Robertson (CB), Las Vegas Raiders
Boston Scott (RB), Philadelphia Eagles
L'Jarius Sneed (CB), Kansas City Chiefs
Trent Taylor (WR), Cincinnati Bengals
Milton Williams (DT), Philadelphia Eagles
Xavier Woods (S), Carolina Panthers

Head coaches

Louisiana Tech has had 34 head coaches and one interim head coach since it started playing organized football in 1901. Two former head coaches, Joe Aillet and William Henry Dietz were inducted into the college football hall of fame. On November 30, 2021, Sonny Cumbie was named the 34th head coach of the Bulldogs. Cumbie previously served as the interim head coach, offensive coordinator and quarterbacks coach at Texas Tech University in 2021.

College Football Hall of Fame
Joe Aillet, inducted in 1989
William Henry Dietz, inducted in 2012

Future non-conference opponents

Announced schedules as of September 9, 2022.
No games have been scheduled yet for the 2030, 2031, or 2032 seasons.

See also
List of NCAA Division I FBS football programs

References

External links

 

 
American football teams established in 1901
1901 establishments in Louisiana